Choi Min-kyung (Hangul: 최민경, Hanja: 崔敏敬) (born 25 August 1982) is a South Korean short track speed skater.

She who won a gold medal in the 3000 m relay at the 2002 Winter Olympics, together with teammates Choi Eun-kyung, Park Hye-won, and Joo Min-jin.

She competed for France at the 2006 Winter Olympics.

External links
 Database Olympics

1982 births
Living people
South Korean female short track speed skaters
Olympic short track speed skaters of South Korea
Olympic gold medalists for South Korea
Olympic short track speed skaters of France
Olympic medalists in short track speed skating
Short track speed skaters at the 1998 Winter Olympics
Short track speed skaters at the 2002 Winter Olympics
Short track speed skaters at the 2006 Winter Olympics
Medalists at the 2002 Winter Olympics
Asian Games medalists in short track speed skating
Short track speed skaters at the 1999 Asian Winter Games
Asian Games gold medalists for South Korea
Asian Games silver medalists for South Korea
Asian Games bronze medalists for South Korea
Medalists at the 1999 Asian Winter Games
French female speed skaters
Universiade medalists in short track speed skating
World Short Track Speed Skating Championships medalists
Universiade gold medalists for South Korea
Universiade bronze medalists for South Korea
Competitors at the 2001 Winter Universiade
20th-century South Korean women
21st-century South Korean women